Phil Lawrence (born 23 June 1955) is a British sailor. He competed in the Star event at the 1992 Summer Olympics.

References

External links
 

1955 births
Living people
British male sailors (sport)
Olympic sailors of Great Britain
Sailors at the 1992 Summer Olympics – Star
Sportspeople from Bournemouth